Calotomus carolinus, commonly known as Carolines parrotfish, is a species of marine ray-finned fish, a parrotfish, in the family Scaridae. It is also known as the starry-eye parrotfish, stareye parrotfish, bucktooth parrotfish, Christmas parrotfish or marbled parrotfish. Since the Calotomus carolinus is known across the Pacific, it also has its own name in many native languages for example, it is called a panuhunuhunu in the Hawaiian language.

Description

The species changes its appearance greatly during the transition to adulthood. Juveniles of the species are typically a mottled orangish-brown, with some pink shading. Adult males, also known as terminal stage, are shades of blue or green, and have pink lines radiating from their eyes. Adult females, also known as the initial phase, are mottled brown and their eyes bulge out slightly. Its jaws consist of pebble-like teeth fused into a beak for eating seaweed, but in juveniles the teeth are not yet fully fused and are visible on the outside of the dental plate.

Distribution
Calotomus carolinus has a wide Indo-Pacific distribution from the coast of East Africa, although not in the Red Sea where it is replaced by Calotomus viridescens, through the Indian Ocean to the eastern Pacific Ocean around the Revillagigedo and the Galapagos Islands.

Habitat and biology
Calotomus carolinus can typically be found as a single fish or in small groups, in shallow reefs or lagoons. Within the wider habitat this species can be found in areas of coral, rubble, seagrass and algae. It feeds on a variety of benthic encrusting algae, Padina and seagrasses. they can also be found in small schools, or even by itself. It is a protogynous hermaphrodite The Calotomus carolinus, along with many of its relatives, feeds on the seaweed and algae growing on the coral which is helpful to the reef ecosystems because most of the algae restrict the coral's growth, keeping it from fully maturing.

Naming and taxonomy
Calotomus carolinus was first formally described as Callyodon carolinus in 1840 by the French zoologist Achille Valenciennes (1795-1865) with the type locality given as the Caroline Islands. When Charles Henry Gilbert described the genus Calotomus in 1890 he designated Calotomus xenodon as its type species, thinking that the genus was monotypic, this was later shown to be a synonyms of C. carolinus.

An example of gender change within the species 
Like a lot of its cousins, a Calotomus carolinus can undergo a sex change There are two phases (which has been mentioned above) are known as initial and terminal phase. In a scientific study, there were 22 initial phase that were between 62 mm and 253 mm. when they grew up, they found out that there were only six terminal phasers, which were in between 240 mm and 270 mm. and the rest were secondary males. This was a prime example of some of the difference between the two genders between these fish.

References

External links
 

 

carolinus
Fish of the Indian Ocean
Fish of the Pacific Ocean
Fish described in 1840
Taxa named by Achille Valenciennes